Christian Poulsen (born 18 September 1979) is a Danish cyclist. He competed in the men's cross-country mountain biking event at the 2004 Summer Olympics.

References

External links
 

1979 births
Living people
Danish male cyclists
Olympic cyclists of Denmark
Cyclists at the 2004 Summer Olympics
People from Kolding
Sportspeople from the Region of Southern Denmark